Andrew James Hoy, OAM (born 8 February 1959) is an Australian equestrian rider. He has won six Olympic medals: three gold, two silvers and one bronze. He has competed in eight Olympic games, from 1984 to 2020 with the exception of 2008,[] which is an Australian record; and at the 2020 Summer Olympics he was 62 years old, making him Australia's oldest ever male Olympian. After winning two medals in Tokyo, he did not rule out trying for future Olympic teams.

Hoy is based in Leicestershire, in the United Kingdom with his team. He has been living in the UK since 1993.

Hoy was inducted into the Sport Australia Hall of Fame in 2000.

Early years 
Andrew Hoy was born in Culcairn, NSW, and spent his earlier years there. He started riding when only six-years-old. The rest of his life has been spent around horses. In 1978, he moved to England to train and now lives there.

Hoy participated in his first International Championships at the age of 19 where he represented Australia at the 1978 World Championships in Kentucky. A year later, he won his first CCI4* competition.

Personal
Andrew and his ex-wife Bettina Hoy, who competed at the Olympic level for Germany, lived for 12 years in Gloucestershire, at the Gatcombe Park estate of The Princess Royal. The Hoys were the only married couple that has ever competed against each other in different teams for the same Olympic medals. In January 2009, the couple moved to the DOKR (Deutsches Olympia Kommitee für Reiterei) in Warendorf, Germany. In June 2010 Andrew Hoy moved to Farley Estate in the UK, and then to Wiltshire. In November 2011, Bettina publicly announced their separation. She handed her ride, Lanfranco TSF to her former husband, Andrew Hoy, under the terms of their divorce agreement. In 2013, Hoy and partner Stefanie Strobl moved to Somerby, Leicestershire. Hoy and Strobl have a daughter and son.

Olympic results

At the 2020 Summer Olympics he rode David and Paula Evans' 12-year-old Anglo-Arab Vassily de Lassos.

CCI5* results

References

External links
 Andrew Hoy: Saddling up for number six, Australian Broadcasting Corporation, 2004
 DatabaseOlympics profile

1959 births
Living people
People from Culcairn
Olympic equestrians of Australia
Australian male equestrians
Equestrians at the 1984 Summer Olympics
Equestrians at the 1988 Summer Olympics
Equestrians at the 1992 Summer Olympics
Equestrians at the 1996 Summer Olympics
Equestrians at the 2000 Summer Olympics
Equestrians at the 2004 Summer Olympics
Equestrians at the 2012 Summer Olympics
Equestrians at the 2020 Summer Olympics
Australian event riders
Olympic gold medalists for Australia
Olympic silver medalists for Australia
Olympic bronze medalists for Australia
Olympic medalists in equestrian
Recipients of the Medal of the Order of Australia
Sport Australia Hall of Fame inductees
Medalists at the 1992 Summer Olympics
Medalists at the 1996 Summer Olympics
Medalists at the 2000 Summer Olympics
Medalists at the 2020 Summer Olympics
Sportsmen from New South Wales